Transpacific may refer to: 

 Transpacific, launched in 1954, grounded on L'Île-aux-Marins near the French Islands of Saint Pierre and Miquelon in the Gulf of St. Lawrence on May 18, 1971, where she remains to this day.
 MT Transpacific, transported over 25,000 55-gallon drums of Agent Orange between South Vietnam and Johnston Atoll in the Summer of 1972 during Operation Pacer IVY.
 , launched in 2001, is a petroleum Tanker that serves TransAtlantic Lines LLC between Japan, Okinawa, Marshall Islands, and Korea.

References